The West African worm lizard (Baikia africana) is a species of amphisbaenian in the family Amphisbaenidae. The species is endemic to Nigeria.

Taxonomy
B. africana is the only species in the genus Baikia.

References

Endemic fauna of Nigeria
Amphisbaenidae
Reptiles described in 1845
Taxa named by John Edward Gray